Dubravka Dačić (born May 6, 1985) is a Slovenian-Italian female professional basketball player.

External links
Profile at eurobasket.com

1985 births
Living people
Sportspeople from Koper
Naturalised citizens of Italy
Italian people of Slovene descent
Slovenian women's basketball players
Italian women's basketball players
Centers (basketball)